The Best of Syd Barrett: Wouldn't You Miss Me? is a compilation album by Syd Barrett released in 2001 that spans Barrett's entire solo career.

Content
Comprising highlights from Syd Barrett's two 1970 albums The Madcap Laughs (seven songs), Barrett (nine songs), and the 1988 out-takes collection Opel (four songs), the album was issued to service casual Barrett fans who presumably would only require one disc of his music.

As a bonus to dedicated Barrett followers, The Best of Syd Barrett: Wouldn't You Miss Me? includes "Two of a Kind", from Barrett's John Peel radio show performance in February 1970, and, courtesy of David Gilmour's personal collection, Barrett's previously-unreleased "Bob Dylan Blues", an original recorded a few days after "Two of a Kind", that before this release was a very rare and sought-after song.

Track listing
All songs by Syd Barrett, except where noted.

 — Possibly written by Richard Wright (according to David Gilmour), though Barrett insisted it was his own composition.

Production
Syd Barrett – producer
Tim Chacksfield – project coordinator
David Gilmour – producer
Peter Jenner – producer
Malcolm Jones – producer, overdub producer
Peter Mew – transfers, remastering
Mark Paytress – liner notes
Nigel Reeve – project coordinator
Phil Smee – package design

References

2001 greatest hits albums
Albums produced by David Gilmour
Albums produced by Richard Wright (musician)
Syd Barrett albums
Albums produced by Roger Waters
EMI Records compilation albums
Harvest Records compilation albums